Project Zomboid is an open-world isometric video game in development by British and Canadian independent developer The Indie Stone. The game is set in the post-apocalyptic, zombie-infested exclusion zone of the fictional Knox County, Kentucky, where the player is challenged to survive for as long as possible before inevitably dying. It was one of the first five games released on the alpha funding section of the gaming portal Desura.

In 2011, The Indie Stone were subject to a high-profile setback within the indie gaming community following the theft of two laptops containing the game's code. Since then, Project Zomboid has appeared on Steam Early Access and continues development to this day. Project Zomboid is The Indie Stone's first commercially released game. The latest stable release is Build 41, released in December 2021, which includes animation and combat overhauls, new audio and music, the city of Louisville, KY, and revamped multiplayer by General Arcade. Project Zomboid is set in 1993, with the game starting by default on July 9; however, the start date and time can be changed in the game settings.

Plot 
The lore of Project Zomboid and the Knox Event is given through radio broadcasts and TV channels. After about July 18, most of these channels go off air. The cause and origin of the Knox Infection are unknown. However, it is theorized by several characters on KnoxTalk, a radio station in the game, that it could be a prion disease, an act of God, or bio-terrorism. The infection is known to spread through saliva, blood, and later on, through water droplets in the air. However, the player is immune to the latter form of infection. After being infected, the player will begin to experience anxiety and nausea, which will progressively worsen until the player eventually succumbs to the infection. There is no cure for the Knox Infection, and it is invariably fatal.

The game begins on July 9, 1993, approximately three days after the United States military set up a blockade surrounding the infected areas of Muldraugh, Riverside, West Point, and Rosewood, dubbed the Knox Evacuation. General John McGrew, a U.S. Army general in charge of containment measures within the Knox Exclusion Zone, later publishes a statement regarding the event, telling people to remain calm and claiming that "There is NO evidence of fatalities within the Exclusion Zone."

On July 11, the WHO grounds all non-medical or non-military international flights to protect other countries from being infected. Riots begin to break out in cities across the United States, and curfews are placed on New York City and Miami after riots cause multiple deaths and injuries. Later that day, a picture is leaked from West Point to the media, showcasing a man with only one arm with blood on his mouth, standing in a street full of dead bodies.

On July 14, thousands of infected people breach the military blockade surrounding the Exclusion Zone, leading the military to pull out. Louisville also becomes infected around this time, although the player can visit Louisville on July 9th and find it infested with zombies. As the Exclusion Zone widens, it is revealed that the virus is beginning to spread through the air. In a last ditch effort, the United States destroys bridges that span the Ohio River, trapping any survivors and zombies within Knox County. 

Finally, on July 17, the virus is confirmed in Cincinnati, multiple cities in England, Mogadishu, Seoul, and Okinawa. John McGrew delivers one final broadcast, informing any survivors to take up arms against the zombies and defend the United States.

Gameplay

In Project Zomboid, the player aims to survive for as long as possible in an apocalyptic and zombie-ridden area around the city of Louisville, Kentucky - referred to as 'Knox Country' - which has been quarantined by the government. The player can choose their character's appearance, occupation, and traits before selecting to spawn within one of four starting towns, the type of trait that is chosen also will influence where exactly the character will spawn (e.g. a firefighter has a higher chance of spawning in a fire station if the chosen town has one). On top of avoiding zombies, the player has to manage their personal needs (such as hunger, stress, fatigue, and boredom) to stay alive through resting, scavenging for supplies, and using survivalist techniques. The player can level skills through activities and reading skill books and magazines. The game uses the traditional Romero style slow-moving zombies, though certain zombies are faster than others, and sandbox mode includes a setting for 28 Days Later-style "sprinter" zombies.

The game features a variety of preset difficulty modes, along with a sandbox mode, which allows the player to customize game settings such as zombie population, virus transmissibility, and the rarity of loot.

'Knox Country' - the playable region in Project Zomboid - heavily bases its locale on the Louisville metropolitan area. The towns of Muldraugh, West Point, and Louisville are loosely replicated in the game world alongside other fictional locations, such as Riverside. The world becomes more desolate and decrepit as time progresses, with water and power grids being shut off within a month, followed by the erosion and overgrowth of the region's structures. Additionally, the game features a set of fixed 'challenge' scenarios, some of which are set on separate, smaller maps and/or feature unique gameplay elements, like an endless winter storm or a zombie horde which tracks the player after one in-game day.

The modding community is very active for this game, further allowing for customization of gameplay via downloadable mods. The mods range from minor changes to the interface such as visible stamina, hunger, and water bars, to complete overhauls of gameplay mechanics, or even the addition of entirely new mechanics. These mods can be found in the Steam Community Workshop. A community wiki is also actively maintained by the players.

Development

According to the developers, the game has been something they "always wanted to make" and their "dream game" although they felt that they would be unable to due to time commitments.  This changed after the success of Minecraft, which showed them "another way to develop a game" that would produce quicker result. According to the team, the main inspiration for the game were zombie movies as opposed to zombie video games.

Beginning
The game was first released on April 25, 2011 as a tech demo. It is written in Java for its portability, using LWJGL.

Early setbacks
In June 2011, soon after the game's release as a paid pre-alpha tech demo, the game was leaked, and unauthorized copies spread to many other websites. The unauthorized version of the game enabled downloading from the Project Zomboids servers with the press of an 'update now' button, regardless of whether the user already had the latest version. In order to avoid paying for these downloads, The Indie Stone took the customer-only paid version offline, and instead, released a free "public tech-demo" for download the next day.

On October 15, 2011, the flat of two of the developers was broken into, and laptops containing large amounts of the game code, which had not been backed up externally, were stolen. This resulted in severe delays to the game development. Due to this setback, they gave a presentation at Rezzed entitled "How (not) to make a video game", going over some of the lessons they have learned since starting the project.

Continuation
As of November 8, 2013, Project Zomboid was released on Steam's Early Access. In February 2014 the Indie Stone released a multiplayer version of the game publicly for the first time. Following this release, the game has been actively updated over time, with numerous overhauls to the gameplay and sound, as well as a removal and subsequent reintegration, of multiplayer. The game is now in a "fully released" version, but new features, additions, and bug removals still happen regularly. The developers also actively communicate with the players, releasing blog posts every two weeks, on Thursdays, known as Thursdoids. These can be about updates, servers, changes or removal of bugs in the next build or mod showcases.

References

External links

The Indie Stone forums

Java platform games
Linux games
Lua (programming language)-scripted video games
MacOS games
Steam Greenlight games
Upcoming video games
Windows games
Video games about zombies
Video games with Steam Workshop support
Early access video games
Video games set in Kentucky
Video games developed in Canada
Video games developed in the United Kingdom
Video games with isometric graphics